William de Rham (born 22 August 1922) is a Swiss former equestrian who competed in the 1956 Summer Olympics.

References

1922 births
Living people
Swiss male equestrians
Olympic equestrians of Switzerland
Equestrians at the 1956 Summer Olympics
Place of birth missing (living people)
20th-century Swiss people